Jasper Matthews Batey (7 July 1891 – 23 October 1916) was an English professional footballer who played for Brighton & Hove Albion in the Southern Football League as a left half.

Personal life
As of 1911, Batey worked as a courier. On 7 January 1915, six months after the outbreak of the First World War, he enlisted in the 17th (Service) Battalion of the Middlesex Regiment as a private. Batey later transferred into the Army Cyclist Corps and was killed in action in Pas-de-Calais on 23 October 1916. He is buried at Cambrin Military Cemetery.

Career statistics

References

1891 births
1916 deaths
Footballers from South Shields
Association football forwards
English footballers
Southern Football League players
Portsmouth F.C. players
Brighton & Hove Albion F.C. players
British Army personnel of World War I
Middlesex Regiment soldiers
Army Cyclist Corps soldiers
British military personnel killed in World War I